The Union for Promoting Progress (UNIPRO) is a political party in the Chinese Special Administrative Region of Macau.

In the 2017 legislative election, the party won 12.65 percent of the popular vote and 2 of the 14 popularly elected seats.

Elected members
Leong Heng Teng, 2001–2009
Iong Weng Ian, 2001–2009
Ho Ion Sang, 2009–present
Wong Kit Cheng, 2013–present

See also
General Union of Neighbourhood Associations of Macau, parent party

References

Political parties in Macau